James Gordon Carter (1795–1845), born James Carter, Jr. in Leominster, Massachusetts, was a member of the Massachusetts House of Representatives and an education reformer.  He was educated at Groton Academy and Harvard College.

He wrote Influence of an Early Education in 1826 (Essays Upon Popular Education), and in 1837, as House Chairman of the Committee on Education, contributed to the establishment of the Massachusetts Board of Education, the first state board of education in the United States.  This was an important stepping stone in the path to government funded schooling.  To the disappointment of many of Carter's supporters, who felt he deserved the honor, Horace Mann was appointed the board's first secretary.

Carter was also instrumental in the reformation of teacher education, and establishment of the first Normal school which later became Framingham State College.  This earned him the sobriquet: "Father of the American Normal School."

He died in Chicago on July 22, 1849.

The James G. Carter Junior High School in Leominster, Massachusetts (now defunct) was named after him.

Notes

Further reading

External links
 History of American Education Web Project. (Site maintained by Dr. Robert N. Barger, University of Notre Dame.)
 Influence of an Early Education by James G.Carter
 Normal Schools - History of American Education Web Project
 https://web.archive.org/web/20070207042814/http://www.schoolchoices.org/roo/classics.htm
 http://american-education.org/350-james-g-carter-17951849.html
https://books.google.com/books?id=SSXJRZi6z-0C&pg=PA13&lpg=PA13&dq=james+g.+carter&source=bl&ots=7ZCzdKg8yn&sig=5hjyIlCqj9HE-EoxuaEFiXmMQts&hl=en&sa=X&ei=JKrWVKzQDM2ANqvzgvgI&ved=0CFAQ6AEwCw#v=onepage&q=james%20g.%20carter&f=false

American educational theorists
Members of the Massachusetts House of Representatives
Education in Massachusetts
1795 births
1849 deaths
19th-century American politicians
Harvard College alumni
Groton School alumni